Dehdari, Deh Dari or Deh-e-Dari may refer to:
 Dehdari, Bushehr, a village in Iran
 Dehdari, Fars, a village in Iran
 Dehdari, Shiraz, a village in Fars Province, Iran
 Dehdari Mashhad F.C., an Iranian football club
 Parviz Dehdari (1935–1992), Iranian football player and coach

See also
 Dari (disambiguation)
 Deri (disambiguation)